The Alexander S. Onassis Foundation was created by Aristotle Onassis to honor the memory of his son Alexander, who died at age 24 in an airplane crash in 1973. Aristotle Onassis died in 1975, and had directed in his will that half of his estate should be transferred upon his own death to a foundation to be established in Alexander's name.  In 1975, the executors of the estate accordingly established a pair of foundations, incorporated in Vaduz, Liechtenstein: the Business Foundation, which acts as a holding company for the underlying business interests, and the Alexander S. Onassis Public Benefit Foundation, which is the sole beneficiary of the Business Foundation. The public benefit foundation is based in Athens, Greece. Aristotle's daughter, Christina Onassis, was the first president of the foundation until her death in 1988.

The foundation is one of the largest in Europe, using its assets to create scholarship and prize programs, build the $75 million Onassis Cardiac Surgery Center in Athens (designed by London-based hospital architect Llewelyn Davies), endow Greek studies chairs at universities, and support other projects. All activities of the Alexander S. Onassis Public Benefit Foundation, from the time of its establishment to the present, are funded exclusively by the profits of the Business Foundation, which engages mainly in shipping and real estate investments.

The foundation's funds ultimately derive from fossil fuels, as the Onassis fleet remains one of the world's largest transporters of oil and petroleum.

Projects 

The Foundation aims at promoting Greek culture and civilization throughout the world and in Greece.  The first international affiliate Onassis Foundation, now known as OnassisUSA, was established in New York City to disseminate information about Hellenic civilization throughout North and South America.
 The Foundation undertook the establishment of the Onassis Library for Hellenic and Roman Art at The Metropolitan Museum of Art in New York, the renovation and equipment of the libraries of the National Archaeological Museum, the Byzantine & Christian Museum and the Benaki Museum in Athens, the architectural preservation and restoration of sites and buildings around the world, as well as countless other endeavors centered on arts and culture. The original Onassis Cultural Center, was built in Athens in 2004 and opened in November 2010., and the Foundation's US presence is in the Olympic Tower on Fifth Avenue, which was built in 1976 and combines offices, shops and luxury apartments. It is also home to the Onassis Cultural Center, which has been open intermittently for exhibits and other programming, but as of 2018 is no longer regularly open to the public. Olympic Tower is currently owned by the foundation, Oxford Properties and Crown Acquisitions.

In the fields of health, the Foundation donated the Onassis Cardiac Surgery Centre (OCSC) to Greece in 1992. The 127-bed capacity OCSC is the first hospital in Greece fully certified in the departments of adult and pediatric heart surgery and cardiology, and the only certified hospital in Greece for heart and lung transplants. Other public benefit projects of the Foundation include financial support to organizations such as ELPIDA, for the establishment of cancer hospital for children, and the Hellenic Society for Disabled Children (ELEPAP).

Beginning in 1978, the Foundation awarded the Onassis International Prizes, bestowed on individuals or organizations in the fields of culture, social achievement and the environment. They were redesigned and expanded in 2008.

References and sources 

Foundations based in Greece
Scholarships
Greek culture
Aristotle Onassis